USS Paul Jones may refer to the following ships of the United States Navy, named after John Paul Jones:

 , a sidewheel steamer, commissioned 1862, decommissioned in 1867.

See also
 , two later United States Navy ships named for John Paul Jones.

United States Navy ship names